Lake County wine is an appellation that designates wine made from grapes grown mostly in Lake County, California and located north of Napa County. Although each region within Lake County has unique viticultural attributes, all are influenced by Clear Lake, the largest inland body of water in California. Lake County enjoys a reputation for bright, concentrated red wines made from Cabernet Sauvignon, Syrah and Zinfandel, and fresh, aromatic whites made from Sauvignon Blanc. Cabernet Sauvignon has the most acreage, with Merlot a distant second.

Benmore Valley AVA 
The Benmore Valley AVA was named after Benjamin Moore, a local 19th century cattle rustler. The valley is a high depression in the mountains of southwestern Lake County, and is much cooler than surrounding areas. Most of the grapes produced there were sourced by Geyser Peak Winery. There are no wineries or planted vineyards located within the boundaries of the AVA as of February 2018.

Big Valley District AVA 
The  Big Valley District AVA viticultural area is located south of the southern shore of Clear Lake and established on October 2, 2013. Big Valley was the first settlement in Lake County and has a long history of agricultural activity. Sauvignon Blanc is the most widely planted varietal in this area. The boundaries of this region include Clear Lake to the north, Mount Konocti and the Red Hills Lake County AVA to the east, Merritt Road and Bell Hill Road to the south, and Highland Springs Road to the west.

Clear Lake AVA 
Half of the area contained within the boundaries of Clear Lake AVA is Clear Lake. The moderating influence of the lake on the surrounding area results in a climate with less diurnal variation in temperature than surrounding areas. Clear Lake AVA is one of the coolest climates in California, which has led to success with grape varietals like Sauvignon blanc.

Guenoc Valley AVA 
Established in 1981, Guenoc Valley AVA was the first American Viticultural Area designation granted to an area with just a single winery. Guenoc Valley is a small inland valley comprising an alluvial fan of Arroyo Seco and Conejo Loam series soils isolated from surrounding areas by rocky ridges.

High Valley AVA 
The High Valley AVA is located in the eastern part of the county. Red volcanic soils can be found on the hillsides while alluvial fans and benches on the valley floor provide well-drained beds for the vines.

Kelsey Bench AVA 
The  Kelsey Bench AVA was established on October 2, 2013. The term "bench" was selected to reflect the topography of the area with higher elevations and hills. Rich soils cover a large portion of the Kelsey Bench with good drainage favorable to growing grapes. The boundaries of the Kelsey Bench AVA are the Big Valley District AVA to the north, the  elevation line that runs east of Kelsey Creek to the east, Kelsey Creek Drive to the south, and Adobe Creek Drive to Highland Springs Road to the west.

Red Hills Lake County AVA 
The Red Hills Lake County AVA lies along the southwestern shores of Clear Lake, separating Excelsior Valley to the east from Big Valley to the west. The hills lie at the foot of Mount Konocti, a volcano which last erupted 11,000 years ago, but which is still regarded as active.

Upper Lake Valley AVA 
On June 3 (2022) the TTB (Alcohol and Tobacco Tax and Trade Bureau) of the United States announced the approval of the Upper Lake Valley AVA. The Upper Lake Valley AVA represents the 8th AVA located in Lake County, California. The area of the Upper Lake Valley AVA covers a series of valleys running north-northwesterly from the shores of Clear Lake. These valleys and the surrounding hillsides sit at elevations of 1,330 feet to 1,480 feet and are slightly cooler than the surrounding areas.

Long Valley AVA (proposed)
This proposed AVA is situated along the northeastern side of the High Valley AVA.

References

External links
 Lake County Winery Association
 TTB AVA Map

California wine
Lake County, California
Geography of Lake County, California
Tourist attractions in Lake County, California